Cochylis fusca is a moth of the family Tortricidae. It is known from Mississippi, Illinois, Indiana, Missouri, Ohio and Pennsylvania.

The ground color of the forewings is fuscous with a black basal band with scattered tawny scales. The indistinct black median band is scattered with tawny scales and the subapical is band black and extending from the costa to the tornus, expanded medially toward the apex, with scattered tawny scales. The apex is black with a few tawny scales. The underside is brown and the fringe concolorous. The hindwings are moderately broad and entirely fuscous, while the fringe is pale fuscous. The underside is concolorous with the upperside.

Adults are on wing from early May to September throughout its range. It possibly overwinters as a last instar larva or as a pupa that emerges in late spring.

Larvae have been reared on the leaves of Solidago species.

Etymology
The species epithet means dark in color, which pertains to the overall appearance of the moth.

References

External links

mothphotographersgroup

Moths described in 2001
Endemic fauna of the United States
fusca